Peter Bucher (April 3, 1947 – May 3, 2019) was a West German handball player who competed in the 1972 Summer Olympics. In 1972 he was part of the West German team which finished sixth in the Olympic tournament. He played all six matches and scored twenty goals.

References

1947 births
2019 deaths
German male handball players
Olympic handball players of West Germany
Handball players at the 1972 Summer Olympics